The Omega Connection is a 1979 American made-for-television action spy film directed by Robert Clouse for Walt Disney Productions. It stars Jeffrey Byron and Larry Cedar. It was released theatrically in other countries as The London Connection.

Plot
Luther Starling (Jeffrey Byron) is a superspy for the American government who after completing his latest mission of retrieving stolen documents sets out on a six week vacation across Europe. Luther is picked up at Heathrow airport in London, England by his friend Roger (Larry Cedar) in his Morgan 3-Wheeler to stay with Roger and Roger's Aunt Lydia (Mona Washbourne) for the duration of the London leg of Luther's trip. By chance the two follow a motorcade where British Secret Service agents Bidley and Peters (Roy Kinnear and David Battley respectively) are escorting a recently defected Eastern European scientist, Professor Buchinski (David Kossoff) who possesses a revolutionary new energy formula. However when a team of armed gunmen ambush the motorcade intent on kidnapping the Professor, Luther attempts to intervene but is outmatched but the professor slips a gold ring into his jacket pocket. Upon discovery of the ring, it leads Luther and Roger on an adventure across London as they attempt to rescue the professor from the villainous criminal organization Omega.

Cast
 Jeffrey Byron as Luther Starling
 Larry Cedar as Roger Pike
 Roy Kinnear as Bidley
 Lee Montague as Vorg
 Mona Washbourne as Aunt Lydia
 David Kossoff as Professor Buchinski 
 Frank Windsor as McGuffin 
 Walter Gotell as Simmons 
 Nigel Davenport as Arthur Minton 
 Dudley Sutton as Goetz
 David Battley as Peters 
 Julian Orchard as Driscoll 
 Kathleen Harrison as Elderly Lady 
 Percy Herbert as Ship's Captain 
 Don Fellows as General 
 Bruce Boa as Colonel
 Wolfe Morris as Dr. Krause
 André Maranne as Duvalier
 Rita Webb as Cockney Woman
 George Pravda as Kolenkov
 Minah Bird as Narcotics Agent

Production
Gloucester Mews, W2, was used as a filming location during the shooting of The London Connection.

References

External links

1979 films
1979 television films
1970s spy action films
American spy action films
Films directed by Robert Clouse
Films scored by John Cameron
Walt Disney Pictures films
American television films
Films with screenplays by Gail Morgan Hickman
1970s English-language films
1970s American films